Area code 520 is a telephone area code in the North American Numbering Plan (NANP) for the U.S. state of Arizona. The numbering plan area comprises Tucson and most of the southeastern part of the state.

Area code 520 was created in a split from area code 602 on March 19, 1995. Previously, 602 had been the sole area code for the entire state of Arizona since the introduction of area codes in 1947 until Arizona's rapid expansion during the second half of the 20th century, and the proliferation of mobile and data communication services in the 1990s required additional numbering resources. It originally contained all of Arizona outside of the Phoenix metropolitan area, but areas outside of southeastern Arizona were split again in 2001 to form area code 928 in 2001.

History
Area code 602 was the only area code for Arizona from its creation in 1947, but by the late 1980s, it was becoming evident that the state would need a second area code to handle population growth and increased demand for telephone numbers. Mountain Bell, the incumbent local exchange carrier in the state, requested a second area code for Arizona in 1988. BellCore, which at the time administered the assignment of area codes, denied Mountain Bell's request and instead placed Arizona into the first phase of interchangeable dialing, in which central office codes with a middle digit of 0 or 1 were made available for use, in 1990. This meant that in-state toll and collect calls would require dialing the area code.

By the early 1990s, Arizona was one of the largest states served by only one area code, and it was apparent that the immediate need for a second area code could no longer be staved off. In advance of the 1995 introduction of interchangeable area codes (area codes with a middle digit not 0 or 1), and in response to continued population growth, Arizona was allocated a second area code, area code 520. The new area code completely surrounded metropolitan Phoenix, which mostly retained 602. 520 was introduced on March 19, 1995. Permissive dialing of 602 continued across Arizona until October 22, 1995. On that date, use of 520 became mandatory for rural Arizona. The new area code became mandatory in Flagstaff, Prescott, and Yuma on June 30, 1996, and in Tucson on December 31, 1996. The freed central office codes in 602 were then used for new telephone numbers in the Phoenix area.

Continued line demand in Arizona outside of metropolitan Phoenix, however, necessitated a second split of 520. In 2000, the Arizona Corporation Commission, which regulates public utilities, began to discuss its options. The telecommunications industry favored a split similar to that eventually adopted but moving Cochise County into the new area code. The eventual split approved by the commission in February 2001 kept Cochise, Pima, Pinal, and Santa Cruz counties in 520 while the new area code, area code 928, was assigned to the remainder of the former 520 area. (Some areas of Pinal County are in 480, while the Gila River Indian Community, which extends into Maricopa County, is in 520.) Permissive dialing of 928 began in July 2001 and ended January 5, 2002.

Prior to October 2021, area code 520 had telephone numbers assigned for the central office code 988. In 2020, 988 was designated nationwide as a dialing code for the National Suicide Prevention Lifeline, which created a conflict for exchanges that permit seven-digit dialing. This area code was therefore scheduled to transition to ten-digit dialing by October 24, 2021.

Service area

Counties
Cochise 
Maricopa 
Pima 
Pinal
Santa Cruz

Municipalities

Ajo
Amado
Arivaca
Arizona City
Bapchule
Benson
Bisbee
Bowie
Casa Grande
Catalina
Cochise
Coolidge
Cortaro
Douglas
Dragoon
Elfrida
Elgin
Eloy
Florence
Fort Huachuca
Green Valley
Hereford
Huachuca City
Kearny
Lukeville
Mammoth
Marana
Maricopa
McNeal
Mount Lemmon
Naco
Nogales
Oracle
Oro Valley
Patagonia
Pearce
Picacho
Pirtleville
Pomerene
Red Rock
Rillito
Rio Rico
Sacaton
Sahuarita
Saint David
San Manuel
San Simon
Sasabe
Sells
Sierra Vista
Sonoita
Stanfield
Superior
Tombstone
Topawa
Tubac
Tucson
Tumacacori
Vail
Valley Farms
Willcox

References

External links

520
520